Andriy Arpadovych Shandor (Ukrainian: Андрій Арпадович Шандор, born 5 January 1966 in Lviv, Ukraine) is a former Ukrainian professional football referee. He has been a full international for FIFA since 2002.

References

External links
 
 Andriy Shandor at allplayers.in.ua
 
 
 

1966 births
Living people
Sportspeople from Lviv
Lviv State University of Physical Culture alumni
Ukrainian football referees
Ukrainian people of Hungarian descent